German submarine U-542 was a Type IXC U-boat of Nazi Germany's Kriegsmarine during World War II.

She was laid down at the Deutsche Werft (yard) in Hamburg as yard number 363 on 12 June 1942, launched on 19 January 1943 and commissioned on 7 April with Oberleutnant zur See Christian-Brandt Coester in command.

U-542 began her service career with training as part of the 4th U-boat Flotilla from 7 April 1943. She was reassigned to the 10th flotilla for operations on 1 October.

She carried out one patrol and did not sink any ships. She was a member of three wolfpacks.

She was sunk on 28 November 1943 north of Madeira by a British aircraft.

Design
German Type IXC/40 submarines were slightly larger than the original Type IXCs. U-542 had a displacement of  when at the surface and  while submerged. She had two shafts and two  propellers.

U-542 was fitted with six  torpedo tubes (four fitted at the bow and two at the stern), 22 torpedoes, one  SK C/32 naval gun, 180 rounds, and a  SK C/30 as well as a  C/30 anti-aircraft gun. The boat had a complement of forty-eight.

Service history

Patrol and loss
The boat departed Kiel on 21 October 1943, moved through the North Sea, negotiated the gap between Iceland and the Faroe Islands and entered the Atlantic Ocean.

She was sunk on 28 November 1943 north of Madeira by depth charges dropped from a British Vickers Wellington of No. 179 Squadron RAF.

Fifty-six men died; there were no survivors.

Wolfpacks
U-542 took part in three wolfpacks, namely:
 Eisenhart 1 (9 – 15 November 1943) 
 Schill 3 (18 – 22 November 1943) 
 Weddigen (22 – 28 November 1943)

References

Bibliography

External links

German Type IX submarines
U-boats commissioned in 1943
U-boats sunk in 1943
World War II submarines of Germany
1943 ships
World War II shipwrecks in the Atlantic Ocean
Ships built in Hamburg
U-boats sunk by depth charges
U-boats sunk by British aircraft
Ships lost with all hands
Maritime incidents in November 1943